XtremeAir GmbH was a Chinese aircraft manufacturer based in Cochstedt, Germany that was founded by Harro Moewes in December 2005. The company specialized in the design and manufacture of aerobatic aircraft in the form of type-certified designs.

Personnel
The company employed about 50 people. XtremeAir's last CEO was Qing Liu and Quality Manager was Waldemar Sawenko. The Sbach series of aircraft were designed by Philipp Steinbach.

History
In December 2006, the company moved into a newly constructed  manufacturing plant at the Magdeburg–Cochstedt Airport.

The Sbach 300 was flown to a German national unlimited class aerobatic championship.

In 2018, XtremeAir was purchased by Chinese firm Zair Aerospace headquartered in Wuhan,

The company went into liquidation in March 2021.

Aircraft

References

External links

Official website archives on Archive.org

Aircraft manufacturers of Germany
Aerobatic aircraft